Cauldcleuch Head is a hill in an unnamed range of Roxburghshire hills north of Langholm, part of the Southern Uplands of Scotland. The highest hill in this range, it has an isolation of approximately 26 km. Parts of the Gorrenberry Jubilee Wood can be found in the Billhope glen to its southwest, where the easiest line of ascent is found.

References

Mountains and hills of the Southern Uplands
Donald mountains
Grahams
 Marilyns of Scotland